"Cry Like a Baby" is a 1968 song written by Dan Penn and Spooner Oldham, and performed by The Box Tops.  The song reached No.2 in April 1968 on the Billboard Hot 100 chart, a position it held for two weeks.  It was kept out of the top spot by Bobby Goldsboro's "Honey", which stayed at No.1 for five weeks.  "Cry Like a Baby" also reached No.2 on Cashbox for one week.  It stayed on the Hot 100 for 15 weeks and Cashbox for 14 weeks.  It was awarded a gold disc for selling over one million copies in the United States.

Spooner Oldham explained in an interview how the song came to be:

In contrast with "The Letter", which was played by the band, "Cry Like a Baby" used the Memphis Boys, American Sound Studio's house band, in the instrumental backing, which features session guitarist Reggie Young playing an electric sitar. Author Peter Lavezzoli cites this part as an example of the widespread influence of Indian classical music on rock and pop music in the late 1960s, in the wake of the Beatles' popularisation of the sitar in songs such as "Within You Without You", from their 1967 album Sgt. Pepper's Lonely Hearts Club Band. Oldham played keyboards on "Cry Like a Baby" in addition to co-writing it. Chilton, who sang lead vocals on the song, was only 17 years old at the time of recording. This version of the song also features a female backup chorus, a brass section, a string section, bass guitar, organ, piano, and drums.

Billboard described the single as an "easy beat rhythm item" that "is loaded with play and sales potential."

The original recording is available on numerous compilations, including Billboard Top Rock'n'Roll Hits: 1968, Classic Rock (Time-Life Music), and AM Gold (Time-Life Music).

Chart performance

Billboard Hot 100 (15 weeks, entered March 2): Reached #2 (2 weeks)

Cashbox (14 weeks, entered March 2): 62, 44, 35, 23, 15, 7, 5, 4, 4, 2, 3, 11, 35, 42

Kim Carnes' version of the song spent 8 weeks on US Hot 100 in 1980, peaking at #44.

Cover versions
1968: The Royal Guardsmen, as part of a medley with "The Letter," on the album Snoopy for President
1968: Betty Wright, on the album My First Time Around (Atco SD-33-260)
1968: Barry St. John, on the album According to St. John (Major Minor MMLP43)
1969: Arthur Alexander, non-album single
1969: Cher, on the album 3614 Jackson Highway (Atco SD 33-298)
1969: Lulu, on the album Lulu's Album (Columbia SCX 6365)
1971: Petula Clark, on the album Warm and Tender (Warner WS 1885)
1980: Kim Carnes, on the albums Romance Dance and Live at Savoy, 1981
2006: Hacienda Brothers
2008: Kiki Dee, on the album Cage the Songbird

References

1968 singles
The Box Tops songs
Kim Carnes songs
Cher songs
Lulu (singer) songs
Betty Wright songs
Songs written by Dan Penn
Song recordings produced by Chips Moman
Songs written by Spooner Oldham
1968 songs